The No Security Tour was a Rolling Stones concert tour to promote the concert album No Security. The tour spanned over 40 shows in North America and Europe in 1999 and grossed $88.5 million from over a million tickets sold.

History
They decided to do a tour with crowds less than 20,000 after the worldwide enormous Bridges to Babylon Tour with crowds of up to 100,000. The band insisted on smaller venues, with fewer special effects, concentrating on the music and band. The tour supported their new album No Security – a live album of Bridges to Babylon Tour recordings. After rehearsing for twelve days in San Francisco, the No Security Tour began on 25 January 1999 at the Oakland Arena in Oakland, California. The European Leg is mainly consisted of cancelled shows from the Bridges to Babylon Tour and festivals. The stage in the European was similar to the one on the Bridges to Babylon Tour without the B stage. 

In July 2018, the band released "From the Vault: No Security Tour - San Jose '99" on CD/vinyl/DVD/Blu-Ray format.

Set list 
This set list is representative of the performance in Washington, D.C. on 7 March 1999. It does not represent all concerts for the duration of the tour.

"Jumpin' Jack Flash"
"Live with Me"
"Respectable"
"You Got Me Rocking"
"Honky Tonk Women"
"Saint of Me"
"Some Girls"
"Paint It Black"
"You Got the Silver"
"Before They Make Me Run"
"Out of Control"
"Route 66"
"When the Whip Comes Down"
"Tumbling Dice"
"It's Only Rock 'n Roll (But I Like It)"
"Start Me Up"
"Brown Sugar"
"Sympathy for the Devil"

Shows

Personnel

The Rolling Stones
Mick Jagger – lead vocals, guitar, harmonica, keyboards
Keith Richards – guitars, vocals
Ronnie Wood – guitars
Charlie Watts – drums

Additional musicians
Darryl Jones – bass, backing vocals
Chuck Leavell – keyboards, backing vocals
Bobby Keys – saxophone
Tim Ries – saxophone, keyboards
Michael Davis – trombone
Kent Smith – trumpet
Lisa Fischer – backing vocals
Bernard Fowler – backing vocals, percussion
Blondie Chaplin – backing vocals, percussion, acoustic guitar

Notes

References

The Rolling Stones concert tours
1999 concert tours
1999 in the United States
1999 in Canada